Ricardo Campos was a Brazilian actor active in the 1950s and 1960s. In the 1953 Governor of São Paulo Prizes for cinema, he won the best newcomer award for O Cangaceiro. He also appeared in The Landowner's Daughter (1953) and The First Mass (1961).

References

External links

Brazilian male film actors
Year of birth missing
Possibly living people